Fall River Mills, colloquially referred to as Fall River, is an unincorporated town and census-designated place (CDP) in Shasta County, California, United States. Its population is 616 as of the 2020 census, up from 573 from the 2010 census.

Production and industry
The community is known for its agriculture, producing cattle, Fall River wild rice, garlic, mint, hay, lavender, and alfalfa.

Local government
Local government in Fall River Mills includes:
 Fall River Valley Municipal Advisory Council
 Fall River Valley Community Services District
 Fall River Valley Fire Protection District
 Fall River Mills Cemetery District
 Mayers Memorial Hospital District
 Fall River Mills Joint Unified School District
 Fall River Resource Conservation District

Education
  Fall River Joint Unified School District
 Elementary Schools
 Fall River Elementary School (K-6) "a California Distinguished School"
 Fall River Elementary Community Day School (K-6)
 High School
 Fall River Jr and Sr High School (7-12) "a California Distinguished School"
 Fall River Community Day School (7-12)
 Soldier Mt Continuation School (9-12)
 Alternative Schools
 Migrant Child Education (K-12)

Transportation

Fall River Mills Airport, Tonkin Field  is a public airport located off Main Street, in downtown Fall River Mills, serving Shasta County. The airport has one runway and is mostly used for general aviation.  It is the only airport within  of Redding and Alturas.

The airport was originally built in the 1940s as a location to train pilots for World War II. Over the years, the airport has been maintained and upgraded largely due to funding provided from the California Aid to Airports Program (CAAP). Today the airport has nine permanent t-hangars, five Portable hangars, approximately 30 tie-downs, and provides aviation fuel sales. The airport is equipped with runway lights which are designed to be turned on at night by the pilots as they approach the airport.

Geography and geology
Fall River Mills is located at  (41.005760, -121.440946).

Fall River Mills is nestled between the Sierra Nevada and the Cascade mountain ranges in the far Northeast corner of Shasta County, California. The town is surrounded by mountains in all four cardinal directions with Mount Shasta and Mount Lassen visible from anywhere in the Fall River Valley.

The surrounding passes all vary from 3,600 to 4,200+ feet.

Fall River Mills is named after one of the rivers (Fall River) which runs near it. This river, along with the Pit River, water the Fall River Valley, wherein Fall River Mills is located. Much of this valley and its surroundings are volcanic, with all the features which comes with such terrain.

Climate

According to the Köppen climate classification system, Fall River Mills has a warm-summer Mediterranean climate, abbreviated "Csb" on climate maps.

Demographics

2010
The 2010 United States Census reported that Fall River Mills had a population of 573. The racial makeup of Fall River Mills was 450 (78.5%) White, 0 (0.0%) African American, 30 (5.2%) Native American, 3 (0.5%) Asian, 2 (0.3%) Pacific Islander, 56 (9.8%) from other races, and 32 (5.6%) from two or more races. Hispanic or Latino of any race were 105 persons (18.3%).

The Census reported that 535 people (93.4% of the population) lived in households, 9 (1.6%) lived in non-institutionalized group quarters, and 29 (5.1%) were institutionalized.

There were 228 households, out of which 71 (31.1%) had children under the age of 18 living in them, 93 (40.8%) were opposite-sex married couples living together, 26 (11.4%) had a female householder with no husband present, 13 (5.7%) had a male householder with no wife present.  There were 15 (6.6%) unmarried opposite-sex partnerships, and 1 (0.4%) same-sex married couples or partnerships. 83 households (36.4%) were made up of individuals, and 41 (18.0%) had someone living alone who was 65 years of age or older. The average household size was 2.35.  There were 132 families (57.9% of all households); the average family size was 3.11.

The population was spread out, with 140 people (24.4%) under the age of 18, 56 people (9.8%) aged 18 to 24, 107 people (18.7%) aged 25 to 44, 147 people (25.7%) aged 45 to 64, and 123 people (21.5%) who were 65 years of age or older.  The median age was 41.8 years. For every 100 females, there were 96.2 males.  For every 100 females age 18 and over, there were 86.6 males.

The homeowner vacancy rate was 6.4%; the rental vacancy rate was 8.9%.  285 people (49.7% of the population) lived in owner-occupied housing units and 250 people (43.6%) lived in rental housing units.

2007
As of 2007, there were 712 people, 261 households, and 173 families residing in the CDP. There were 304 housing units at an average density of 111/sq mi (43/km2). The racial makeup of the CDP was 81% White, 10% Native American, 5% from other races, and 4% from two or more races. Hispanic or Latino of any race were 12% of the population.

There were 261 households, out of which 35% had children under the age of 18 living with them, 46% were married couples living together, 16% had a female householder with no husband present, and 33% were non-families. 32% of all households were made up of individuals, and 15% had someone living alone who was 65 years of age or older. The average household size was 2.46 and the average family size was 3.01.

In the CDP the population was spread out, with 31% under the age of 18, 7% from 18 to 24, 22% from 25 to 44, 23% from 45 to 64, and 17% who were 65 years of age or older. The median age was 37 years. For every 100 females, there were 83.6 males. For every 100 females age 18 and over, there were 82.9 males.

The median income for a household in the CDP was $29,833, and the median income for a family was $34,306. Males had a median income of $35,197 versus $21,364 for females. The per capita income for the CDP was $15,667. About 22% of families and 28% of the population were below the poverty line, including 53% of those under age 18 and 18% of those age 65 or over.

Politics

Plans for the Incorporation of the Fall River Mills communities into a City or Town were started. Stemming from public outcry due to development plans and a need for the local communities to maintain control over the area. Formation of a Municipal Advisory Council or MAC is ongoing. The MAC will be the political and authoritative voice of the Fall River Mills communities to not only Shasta County but the State of California. Plans are also being drafted for the implementation of several municipal services to include but not be limited to, Parks & Recreation, Police Department, Transportation, Community Facilities, Animal Control, Cemetery, Fire and Emergency Services. These are just a few of the services listed as proposed by the town of Fall River Mills and the Fall River Valley Community Services District. Areas proposed for inclusion in the incorporation are the communities of Fall River Mills, McArthur, Pittville, Glenburn and Dana.

Recreation
The Fall River Valley offers recreation for people of all ages and backgrounds with opportunities being numerous. These include many annual events, festivals and fairs. The Fall River Valley is home to a World Class Golf course. multiple locations for Mountain Climbing and Spelunking. Sport angling including Fly Fishing, with several tournaments and derbies held each year. Hunting in the Fall River Valley offers several big game species and upland game and waterfowl.

Boating and Canoeing are popular in the Fall River Valley as it is home to several Lakes including Fall River Lake, Eastman Lake and Big Lake. White Water Rafting is among several popular sporting activities that take advantage of the river systems in the valley. These tributaries include the Fall River, Tule River, Ja-She Creek, Lava Creek, Bear Creek, Shelly Creek and Pit River. Together they span much of the Valley forming one of the largest systems of fresh water springs in the country. These waters culminate in a splendid waterfall south of the Town of Fall River Mills and again at a viewing point off State Highway 299 West of Fall River Mills. The Valley is home to the Ahjumawi Lava Springs State Park, located north of the Fall River-McArthur Town Center. This state park is unique in that it is accessible only by water.

Local arts and culture can be viewed in several artists galleries and gift shops throughout the community. Equestrian and Rodeo Events are held throughout the year with the Intermountain Fair Rodeo being the mainstay event.

Several parks are situated throughout the community, offering family activities and sporting venues. These include Clark Field, Fall River Lions Community Park and the Joe Bruce Sports Complex.

Cycling has been extremely popular in the Valley for over a decade. Hundreds of cyclists come from throughout the country each year to participate in the Fall River Century Bike Ride which is held in late spring.

Tourism
The town of Fall River Mills is located in the Fall River Valley, between the two volcanic mountain peaks of Mount Shasta and Mount Lassen.

The river has rainbow trout fishing holes. Fall River is piped through Saddle Mountain, to end at the Pit 1 Power House. There is white water rafting and fly fishing on the creeks in the area.

The weather can be very cold in the winter, while the spring, summer, and early fall has warm days and cool nights. The town is a traditional Northern California agricultural community. It is known for its wild rice, cattle, hay, lavender, and mint.

Notable residents
Please note: Not all the following people actually reside in Fall River Mills. Many only own property in the area.
 George Crook (September 8, 1828 – March 21, 1890) was a career Army officer, noted for distinguished service during American Civil War and Indian Wars.
 William Hanna, creator of beloved cartoon series Tom and Jerry, The Flintstones, The Jetsons, Scooby-Doo and many others.
 Dan Hawkins, football head coach, UC Davis, Colorado and Boise State; born in Fall River Mills.
 Bing Crosby, actor and singer, spearheaded fundraising efforts to build and furnish Fall River Mills's only hospital.
 Jamie Pineda of Fall River Mills, frontwoman of pop music project Sweetbox.
 Mark Wilson of Fall River Mills, offensive tackle for NFL's Oakland Raiders.
 Brian Barrett of Fall River Mills, chairman of the bass fishing league book club. A pioneer in organic chicken farming.

Gallery

References

External links

 Fall River Valley Community Services District
  Mountain Echo Newspaper
  Fall River Theatre
  Fort Crook Museum
  Mayers Memorial Hospital District

Census-designated places in Shasta County, California
Unincorporated communities in Shasta County, California
Pit River
Populated places established in 1855
1855 establishments in California
Census-designated places in California
Unincorporated communities in California